Guajardo is a Spanish surname that may refer to:

Andrés Guajardo (1930–2000), Spanish jurist, businessman and politician 
Anisa Guajardo (born 1991), Mexican-American football striker
Carlos Alberto Guajardo Romero (1973–2010), Mexican journalist 
Daniela Guajardo (born 1990), Chilean road cyclist 
Fabiola Guajardo (born 1987), Mexican actress and model
Ildefonso Guajardo Villarreal (born 1957), Mexican economist and politician 
Juan Antonio Guajardo Anzaldúa (1958–2007), Mexican politician
Jorge Guajardo, Mexican politician and diplomat 
Luis Guajardo (born 1973), Chilean football player
Mary Telma Guajardo (born 1959), Mexican politician 
Rafael Aguilar Guajardo (1950–1993), Mexican drug lord and federal police commander
René Guajardo (1933–1992), Mexican professional wrestler
Roberto Guajardo Suárez (1918–2008), Mexican lawyer 
Víctor Guajardo (born 1990), Mexican football player

Spanish-language surnames